Malta Aviation Museum is an aircraft museum situated on the site of the former Royal Air Force airfield in the village of Ta'Qali, on the island of Malta. The museum, based in three hangars, covers the history of aviation on the island with exhibits, particularly from the Second World War and post-war periods. The museum is involved in the preservation and restoration of aircraft, some of which are in airworthy condition. In 2021, a new Main Exhibition Hangar was funded by the EU.

List of exhibits

Main Exhibition Hangar

Exhibits include 
 Gloster Meteor x2  
 Douglas Dakota
 Cessna Birddog 
 North American Texan 
 Piper Cub
 Fiat G.91
 English Electric Lightning Cockpit
 Agusta Bell 47G helicopter

Air Battle of Malta Memorial Hangar
This hangar, purpose-built and opened in 2005, features airframes from the Second World War period, several examples restored from casualties of the Battle of Malta.
 de Havilland Tiger Moth
 Hawker Hurricane IIa Z3055
 Supermarine Spitfire IX (EN199)
 Fairey Swordfish (fuselage skeleton)

Romney Exhibition Hangar
The space, which includes the museum entrance and restoration workshop, has exhibits including:

 de Havilland Vampire
 Link Trainer
 Sea Venom 
 Hawker Sea Hawk

Gallery

See also
 List of museums in Malta
 List of aerospace museums

Bibliography
 Ogden, Bob. Aviation Museums and Collections of Mainland Europe. 2006. Air-Britain (Historians) Limited. Tonbridge, Kent. .

References

Museums in Malta
Attard